Belafonte Sings the Blues is an album by Harry Belafonte, released by RCA Victor (LPM/LSP-1972) in 1958. It was recorded in New York City on January 29 (with Alan Greene as conductor) and March 29 (with Bob Corman as conductor), and in Hollywood on June 5 and 7 (conducted by Dennis Farnon). The album was Belafonte's first to be recorded in stereophonic sound.

Track listing
 "A Fool for You" (Ray Charles)
 "Losing Hand" (Charles Calhoun (Jesse Stone)
 "One For My Baby" (Johnny Mercer, Harold Arlen)
 "In the Evenin' Mama" (C. C. Carter)
 "Hallelujah I Love Her So" (Ray Charles)
 "The Way That I Feel" (Fred Brooks)
 "Cotton Fields" (C. C. Carter)
 "God Bless the Child" (Billie Holiday. Arthur Herzog Jr.)
 "Mary Ann" (Ray Charles)
 "Sinner's Prayer" (Lowell Fulson)
 "Fare Thee Well" (Fred Brooks)

Personnel
Harry Belafonte  – vocals

1958 albums
Harry Belafonte albums
Blues albums by American artists
RCA Victor albums